Álvaro González Soberón (born 8 January 1990), known simply as Álvaro, is a Spanish professional footballer who plays as a central defender for Saudi Professional League club Al Nassr.

He began his career with Racing de Santander, and had spells playing for Zaragoza, Espanyol and Villarreal for La Liga totals of 233 matches and five goals. He signed for Marseille in 2019, initially on loan.

Álvaro won the 2013 European Under-21 Championship with Spain.

Club career

Racing Santander
Born in Potes, Cantabria, Álvaro was a product of local club Racing de Santander's youth ranks, and made his professional debut in the 2009–10 season, appearing in 23 games for the reserves in the Segunda División B and being relegated. He made his first-team and La Liga debut on 1 May 2011, starting and playing 82 minutes in a 2–0 home win against RCD Mallorca.

In May 2011, Álvaro signed a four-year contract with Racing. Due to injuries to teammates, he began 2011–12 in the starting eleven. On 14 November, a €2 million offer from FC Dnipro Dnipropetrovsk was rejected. He remained a starter until the end of the campaign, when they were relegated.

Zaragoza
On 11 July 2012, Álvaro signed a four-year deal with Real Zaragoza. In his first year he was again first choice, but the Aragonese side also dropped down to the Segunda División.

Álvaro scored his first goal for the team on 10 November 2012, in a 5–3 victory over Deportivo de La Coruña.

Espanyol and Villarreal
On 28 July 2014, Álvaro returned to the top flight after agreeing to a five-year contract with RCD Espanyol. In preparation for 2016–17 he was made fourth captain behind Javi López, Víctor Sánchez and Víctor Álvarez, but on 31 August 2016 he was transferred to Villarreal CF on a four-year deal. 

Álvaro made his competitive debut for Villarreal on 15 September 2016, in a 2–1 home win against FC Zürich in the group stage of the UEFA Europa League. His first league appearance came ten days later in the 3–1 home defeat of CA Osasuna where he played 90 minutes and gave away a penalty which resulted in the opponent's goal.

Marseille

On 19 July 2019, Álvaro joined French club Olympique de Marseille on a season-long loan, with a mandatory purchase option of €5 million on 30 June 2020. During a Ligue 1 match against Paris Saint-Germain F.C. on 13 September 2020, he was involved in a mass brawl which resulted in five players receiving red cards. Following the incident, PSG forward Neymar claimed that the incident began following racist remarks from Álvaro. 

Álvaro scored his first goal in the French top tier on 17 February 2021, opening the 3–2 home win over OGC Nice. In March of the following year, having ceased to be part of manager Jorge Sampaoli's plans, he profited from an international break to return to his country, and subsequently failed to report to training.

On 1 August 2022, Álvaro was released from his contract.

Al Nassr
On 29 August 2022, Álvaro agreed to a one-year deal at Al Nassr FC of the Saudi Professional League, with the option to extend for another.

International career
Álvaro earned his only cap for Spain at under-21 level on 12 June 2013, in a 3–0 defeat of the Netherlands in the group phase of the UEFA European Championship. His team went on to win the tournament in Israel.

Career statistics

Club

1Includes Copa del Rey and Coupe de France
2Includes Coupe de la Ligue
3Includes UEFA Europa League, UEFA Champions League and UEFA Europa Conference League
4Includes Trophée des Champions

Honours
Spain U21
UEFA European Under-21 Championship: 2013

References

External links

1990 births
Living people
Spanish footballers
Footballers from Cantabria
Association football defenders
La Liga players
Segunda División players
Segunda División B players
Tercera División players
Rayo Cantabria players
Racing de Santander players
Real Zaragoza players
RCD Espanyol footballers
Villarreal CF players
Ligue 1 players
Olympique de Marseille players
Saudi Professional League players
Al Nassr FC players
Spain under-21 international footballers
Spanish expatriate footballers
Expatriate footballers in France
Expatriate footballers in Saudi Arabia
Spanish expatriate sportspeople in France
Spanish expatriate sportspeople in Saudi Arabia